Cynodonichthys is a genus of freshwater killifish in the family Rivulidae. They are found in Middle America, ranging from southern Mexico (north to Oaxaca and the Yucatán Peninsula), through Central America (where most species live), to Colombia (in the northwest and the Magdalena River basin).

Species
Until 2011, Cynodonichthys were included in Rivulus, and some prefer to maintain them in that genus.

If recognized as a valid genus, there are currently 32 species in Cynodonichthys:

 Cynodonichthys azurescens (Vermeulen, 2013)
 Cynodonichthys birkhahni (Berkenkamp & Etzel, 1992)
 Cynodonichthys boehlkei (Huber & Fels, 1985)
 Cynodonichthys brunneus (Meek & Hildebrand, 1913)
 Cynodonichthys chucunaque (Breder, 1925)
 Cynodonichthys degreefi (Collier, 2016)
 Cynodonichthys elegans (Steindachner, 1880)
 Cynodonichthys frommi (Berkenkamp & Etzel, 1993)
 Cynodonichthys fuscolineatus (W. A. Bussing, 1980)
 Cynodonichthys glaucus (W. A. Bussing, 1980)
 Cynodonichthys godmani (Regan, 1907)
 Cynodonichthys hendrichsi (Álvarez & Carranza, 1952)
 Cynodonichthys hildebrandi (G. S. Myers, 1927)
 Cynodonichthys isthmensis (Garman, 1895)
 Cynodonichthys kuelpmanni (Berkenkamp & Etzel, 1993)
 Cynodonichthys leucurus (Fowler, 1944)
 Cynodonichthys magdalenae (C. H. Eigenmann & Henn, 1916)
 Cynodonichthys monikae (Berkenkamp & Etzel, 1995)
 Cynodonichthys montium (Hildebrand, 1938)
 Cynodonichthys myersi (C. L. Hubbs, 1936)
 Cynodonichthys pacificus (Huber, 1992)
 Cynodonichthys pivijay (Vermeulen, 2013)
 Cynodonichthys ribesrubrum (Vermeulen, 2013)
 Cynodonichthys rubripunctatus (W. A. Bussing, 1980)
 Cynodonichthys siegfriedi (W. A. Bussing, 1980)
 Cynodonichthys sucubti (Breder, 1925)
 Cynodonichthys tenuis Meek, 1904
 Cynodonichthys uroflammeus (W. A. Bussing, 1980)
 Cynodonichthys villwocki (Berkenkamp & Etzel, 1997)
 Cynodonichthys wassmanni (Berkenkamp & Etzel, 1999)
 Cynodonichthys weberi (Huber, 1992)
 Cynodonichthys xi (Vermeulen, 2013)

References

Rivulidae
Freshwater fish genera
Taxa named by Seth Eugene Meek